Mario Manuel Bartolo Montalbetti Solari (born 1953 in Callao) is a Peruvian syntactician and a professor of linguistics within the Department of Linguistics at the University of Arizona, as well as a poet.

Career
Mario Montalbetti studied Literature in Pontificia Universidad Católica del Perú. He holds a PhD in Linguistics from the Massachusetts Institute of Technology. , he holds the title of Associate Professor in the Department of Spanish and Portuguese at the University of Arizona and is also a member of the faculty of the Second Language Acquisition and Teaching (SLAT) Program and the Center for Latin American Studies. His research interests include theoretical linguistics and Spanish morphology and syntax.

Publications

See also 
 Literature of Peru
 Montalbetti sentence

References

External links 

1953 births
Living people
Syntacticians
MIT School of Humanities, Arts, and Social Sciences alumni
University of Arizona faculty
20th-century Peruvian poets
People from Callao
Peruvian male poets
20th-century male writers